Ferrante III Gonzaga (4 April 1618 – 11 January 1678), was a Duke of Guastalla.

He was the son of Cesare II Gonzaga, Duke of Guastalla and Duke of Amalfi and Isabella Orsini.

Life

He succeeded his father in 1632. In 1638 he sold all the minor Neapolitan fiefs and in 1640 also sold the Principality of Molfetta. He was invested as Knight of the Order of San Jago and Commendator of Villahermosa in 1639.

Marriage and Issue

On 25 June 1647, Ferrante III married Princess Margherita d'Este (1619-1692), daughter of Duke Alfonso III d'Este of Modena. They had six children:
 Isabella (d. 1653).
 Rinaldo (1652 – 9 October 1657).
 Cesare (1653–1666).
 Anna Isabella (12 February 1655 – 18 August 1703), married in 1670 Ferdinando Carlo Gonzaga (1652–1708), Duke of Mantua and Monferrato.
 Maria Vittoria (9 September 1659 – 5 September 1707), married in 1679 her cousin Vincenzo Gonzaga.
 Vincenzo (d. 1665/66).

When Ferrante III died without surviving male heirs, the Duchy of Guastalla became officially a part of the Duchy of Milan, but was ruled by Ferdinando Carlo of Mantua (husband of the eldest surviving daughter) between 1678 and 1692. Due to Austrian intervention, the Duchy then passed to Vincenzo Gonzaga (husband of the second daughter).

Notes

1618 births
1678 deaths
Ferrante 3
Ferrante 3
17th-century Italian nobility